Donald Kingsley Kirk is an Australian Anglican bishop. Since June 2019 he has been the Bishop of Riverina in the Anglican Church of Australia.

Kirk trained for ordination at St John's College, Morpeth, and was ordained in 1986. His first ministry appointment in charge of a parish was in 1989 in Mount Vincent, near Cessnock in New South Wales. He served as Dean of Grafton from 2008 until 2017, then served as rector of the Parish of Hamilton and Archdeacon of the Southwest in the Anglican Diocese of Ballarat until his election as bishop.

Kirk was installed as Bishop of Riverina on 15 June 2019 at St Alban the Martyr Cathedral, Griffith.

As bishop, during the intense drought in the Riverina region, Kirk criticised the water market in the Murray-Darling Basin and called for water to be recognised as not only a commercial commodity but a physical and spiritual fundamental.

Kirk is married to Camryn and has a son and daughter.

References

21st-century Anglican bishops in Australia
Anglican bishops of Riverina
Deans of Grafton
People educated at St John's College, Morpeth
Living people
Year of birth missing (living people)